A list of works that were produced using rotoscoping.

Animated films
 The Adventures of Pinocchio
 Alice in Wonderland
 All Dogs Go to Heaven
 Alois Nebel
 American Pop
 An American Tail (Human characters)
 Anastasia
 The Arrow Flies in the Tale - short
 The Black Cauldron
 The Brave Man's Heart - short 
 Brothers Lyu - short 
 The Case of Hana & Alice
 Cross Country Detours - short (The deer, crying bobcat and shedding lizard)
 A Christmas Carol
 Chico & Rita
 Cinderella
 The Cow's Husband - short
 Daffy - The Commando - short (Adolf Hitler)
 Dude Duck - short (The pretty cowgirls)
 Earthlink Sucks - short
 The Even More Funtrip - short
 Fard - short
 Fantasia
 Fantasia 2000
 The Adventures of Tintin
 Felix the Cat: The Movie
 Fellow-Friends - short
 Fire & Ice
 The Flower with Seven Colors - short
 The Frog Princess
 Geese-Swans - short
 Germania Wurst - short
 The Girl Who Leapt Through Time
 The Golden Antelope
 Grasshopper - short
 Gulliver's Travels
 Have a Nice Day (film)
 Heavy Metal
 Hello Aloha - short (The dancing Hula Girl)
 Hey Good Lookin'
 How People Got Fire - short
 The Humpbacked Horse
 I Lost My Body
 I Love You - short
 Jack Frost - short (The singing scarecrow)
 Kashtanka
 Kid's Story (The Animatrix short)
 Welcome to Irabu's Office
 The Legend about the Moor's Testament
 Life is Cool
 Little Boy Blue - short (The dancing scarecrow)
 The Little Mermaid
 A Lively Market Garden - short
 A Letter To Colleen
 The Lord of the Rings
 Loving Vincent
 The Magic Bird - short
 The Magic Shop - short
 A Magical Treasure - short
 Mashenka's Concert - short
 A Miraculous Bell - short
 Minnie the Moocher - short (The dancing walrus rotoscoped from Cab Calloway dancing)
 Mr. Bug Goes to Town
 Moidodir - short
 The Night Before Christmas
 Nobunaga Concerto
 The Oak-Tree Thrower - short
 The Old Man of the Mountain - short (The dancing Old Man rotoscoped from Cab Calloway dancing)
 The Old Oak-Trees Tale - short
 Once Upon a Time in the Woods - short
 One Hundred and One Dalmatians
 Out of the Inkwell
 Peace on Earth - short
 The Pebble and the Penguin
 Piercing I
 Pinocchio (Blue Fairy)
 Portraits de Voyages
 Princess Iron Fan
 Przygody Kubusia - short
 Puzzle 3D - short
 Renaissance
 Rock-a-Doodle
 Rock & Rule
 Sally Swing - short
 Sarmiko - short
 A Scanner Darkly
 The Scarlet Flower
 The Secret of NIMH (Human characters)
 Sister Alenushka and Brother Ivanushka - short
 Sleeping Beauty
 Snack and Drink - short
 The Snow Maiden
 The Snow Queen
 Snow White (1933 cartoon) - short (The singing Koko the Clown rotoscoped from Cab Calloway dancing)
 Snow White and the Seven Dwarfs
 The Spine of Night
 The Straw Bull-Calf - short
 The Sturdy Fellow - short
 Superman (1940s animated film series)
 Taiga Tale - short
 The Tale about the Dead Tsarevna and Seven Bogatyrs - short
 The Tale about the Soldiers - short
 The Tale of the Fisherman and the Fish - short
 Tehran Taboo
 Thugs with Dirty Mugs - short (The audience member who’s silhouetted directly against the movie-screen)
 Three Bags with Tricks - short
 Thumbelina
 The Tin Soldier (1989) - short 
 Titan A.E.
 A Troll in Central Park
 The Twelve Brothers-Month
 Two Silhouettes (Make Mine Music segment)
 Verlioka - short
 Waking Life
 A Walnut Switch - short
 When The New Year Trees Lights Up
 Why Can't We Walk Straight - short
 Wizards
Yard - short
 Year of the Fish
 The Yellow Stork - short
 Yellow Submarine

Live action films
 The Birds
 Brenda Starr (comic strip sequences)
 Bride of Frankenstein (The homunculus scene)
 Cool World
 Chopping Mall (laser effects)
 Demon Wind (hand rotoscoped demonic effects throughout)
 The Good, the Bad and the Ugly (title sequence)
 Guardians of the Galaxy (Rocket Raccoon was created by rotoscoping Oreo, a tame raccoon.)
 Harry and the Hendersons (scenes from the film are rotoscoped for the end credits)
 The Inglorious Bastards (title sequence)
 Juno (Title sequence is rotoscoped.)
 The Last Waltz (cocaine under Neil Young's nose was rotoscoped out in post-production)
 The Lord of the Rings film trilogy (For the character Gollum, rotoscoping live action shots with keyframe computer animation and motion capture)
 Sin City
 Spaceballs (schwartz-saber effects)
 Speed Racer (Many of the night race sequences involved rotoscoping the computer generated background scenes for a more non-realistic look)
 Star Wars Trilogy (lightsaber effects)
 Tower (combination of rotoscoped action, live & historical footage)
 Tron (combination of computer animation and live action)
 Who Framed Roger Rabbit (combination of traditional animation and live action)

Video games

 Another World
 Batman Forever
 Blackthorne
 Commander Blood
 Dragon's Lair (NES version only)
 Dragon's Lair II: Time Warp (only used for the time machine)
 FAITH: The Unholy Trinity (Only used for the cutscenes)
 Flashback: The Quest for Identity
 "Heavenly Star", by Genki Rockets, as featured in the PSP game Lumines II
 Hotel Dusk: Room 215
 King's Quest VI: Heir Today, Gone Tomorrow
 Last Window: The Secret of Cape West
 Joy Mecha Fight
 Just Dance
 Karateka
 The Last Express
 Lester the Unlikely
 Mortal Kombat (in early games in the series)
 Nosferatu
 Prince of Persia
 Project Firestart
 Space Ace (only used for Ace's spaceship "Star Pac", his motorcycle, and the tunnel in the game's dogfight sequence)
 Shaq Fu
 Star Wars: Dark Forces (Only used for the animations of Darth Vader)
 Street Fighter III: 3rd Strike (Only used for the animations of the capoeira character Elena)
 The Banner Saga
 Wing Commander II (Only used for the kiss scene between Blair and Angel)

Music videos
 "21st Century Breakdown" by Green Day
 "Baby I'm Yours" by Breakbot
 "Bedshaped" by Keane
 "Breaking the Habit" by Linkin Park
 "Brothers in Arms" by Dire Straits
 "Calling All Girls" by Hilly Michaels
 "Destiny" by Zero 7
 "Drive" by Incubus
 "Fell in Love with a Girl" by The White Stripes
 "Forsaken by Dream Theater
 "Frijolero" by Molotov
 "Frontline" by Pillar
 "Go with the Flow" by Queens of the Stone Age
 "The Kids Aren't Alright" by The Offspring
 "Lemonade" by The Bawdies
 "Let It Slide" by Joanna Pacitti
 "Like to Get to Know You Well" by Howard Jones
 "Lone Digger" by Caravan Palace
 "Luv Your Life" by Silverchair
 "Momma's Boy" by Chromeo
 "Money for Nothing" by Dire Straits
 "No More Lies" by The Moody Blues
 "Opposites Attract" by Paula Abdul
 "Shadrach" by Beastie Boys
 "Shoot the Runner" by Kasabian
 "Take On Me", "Train of Thought", and "The Sun Always Shines On TV" by A-ha
 "Ten Thousand Strong" by Iced Earth
 "Tom Waits for No One" by Tom Waits
 "Toshishun" by Ningen Isu
 "Uno, Dos, Tres" by Motel
 "Heartless" By Kanye West
 "Wash In The Rain" by The Bees
 "What You Need" and "Need You Tonight" by INXS
 "You Got Me Up" by Jamie Lidell
 "You Know I Love You, Don't You" by Howard Jones
 "Bad Kids to the Back" by Snarky Puppy

Television shows
 The Aquabats! Super Show! (segment in episode "The Return of The Aquabats!") (2013)
 Blackstar
 Codefellas
 Delta State
 Dream Corp, LLC
 Doin' The Thin Thing from A Little Curious (1998)
 Easy For You! from A Little Curious (1999)
 Flowers of Evil
 He-Man and the Masters of the Universe
 It's Flashbeagle, Charlie Brown (dance club scenes)
 Josie and the Pussycats (band's performance sequences)
 Jem (intro)
 Kowabon
 The Lone Ranger (Filmation 1980)
 The New Adventures of Flash Gordon
 The New Adventures of Batman
 The New Adventures of Zorro (Filmation 1981)
 Rocket Launch from Sesame Street Pilot (1969)
 She's a Good Skate, Charlie Brown (figure skating scenes)
 Skyland
 Space Sentinels
 Sport Billy
 Tarzan, Lord of the Jungle 
 Tarzan/Batman and the Super 7
 Undone
 What Have We Learned, Charlie Brown? (portions)

Commercials
 Bubble Tape (1989)
 Fruit Wrinkles (1980s)
 Toyota Supra (1986)
 Nickelodeon IDs: Mengarie, Bicycles and Skating (1989)
 Charles Schwab (2008)
 Akbank (2010–2011)

Comics
 The DaneMen (2005-2017)

References

Lists of films by technology
Animation techniques